

Molluscs

Bivalves

Arthropods

Newly named arachnids

Newly named insects

Fish

Newly named bony fish

Archosauromorphs

Newly named dinosaurs
 Fossil hunters working on behalf of the Royal Saskatchewan Museum discover a large coprolite from a theropod dinosaur in Maastrichtian strata. In 1997 it is sent to coprolite specialist Karen Chin, who determines that this specimen of fossilized feces was attributable to Tyrannosaurus rex. One year later, in 1998, Karen Chin and others publish a joint paper in Nature announcing the finding.
 Paul Sereno lead an expedition to the Kem Kem region of southeastern Morocco. Among the fossils discovered is a partial skull of Carcharodontosaurus saharicus. Significantly, it preserves a "complete and undistorted braincase" which would later be described in detail along with the structure of the inner ear of C. saharicus by Hans C. E. Larsson in 2001.

Data courtesy of George Olshevsky's dinosaur genera list.

Newly named birds

Pterosaurs

New taxa

References

 
1990s in paleontology
Paleontology